Bogusława Olechnowicz-Dzierżak (born 22 November 1962) is a Polish judoka. She competed in the women's half-middleweight event at the 1992 Summer Olympics.

References

External links
 

1962 births
Living people
Polish female judoka
Olympic judoka of Poland
Judoka at the 1992 Summer Olympics
Sportspeople from Słupsk